Egg Harbor City is a train station in Egg Harbor City, New Jersey. It serves NJ Transit trains and buses, as well as the Amtrak Thruway Motorcoach. Shuttles to the Egg Harbor City station connect to the Atlantic City International Airport, the Visitors Center at the FAA Technical Center and Stockton University, as well as bus lines to the Hamilton Mall and the PATCO Speedline at the Lindenwold station.

Station layout

References

External links
 

 Station from Philadelphia Avenue from Google Maps Street View

Railway stations in Atlantic County, New Jersey
Egg Harbor City, New Jersey
NJ Transit Rail Operations stations
Amtrak Thruway Motorcoach stations in New Jersey